Sierra la Primavera is a Late Pleistocene volcanic centre in Jalisco of central-western Mexico, located immediately west of Guadalajara in La Primavera Biosphere Reserve. It consists of a caldera, lava domes and lava flows that have formed in the last 200,000 years, with the latest known volcanic eruption having occurred about 30,000 years ago.

Geology
The formation of Sierra la Primavera commenced about 120,000 years ago with the eruption of rhyolitic flows and domes. The tephra forms a volcanic deposit known as the Tala Tuff and consists of voluminous pumice flows.

Subsequent filling of the caldera with water resulted in the formation of a lake through which several lava domes were created. Several lava domes were emplaced along the caldera about 95,000 years ago, which was followed by the eruption of a younger series of ring domes about 75,000 years ago.

After uplift and sedimentation filled the lake, a final series of lava domes were erupted along the southern margin of the caldera about 60,000 to 30,000 years ago. Although volcanic eruptions are not known to have occurred from Sierra la Primavera in recorded history, it is still potentially active, containing a series of fumaroles and hot springs.

Subfeatures
Sierra la Primavera contains 29 named subfeatures:

See also
List of volcanoes in Mexico

References

Calderas of Mexico
VEI-6 volcanoes
Pleistocene calderas
Potentially active volcanoes
Trans-Mexican Volcanic Belt
Volcanoes of Jalisco